The fourth series of Promi Big Brother started on 2 September 2016 and ended on 16 September 2016. It was the fourth series of the Big Brother franchise on Sat.1, after it left RTL II. 5 celebrity housemates ("promis") entered the house on Day 1 and the other 7 celebrities entered on Day 3. The show was hosted by Jochen Schropp.

Format
Promis had participated in tasks and matches for treats or to avoid punishments. Daily nominations also took place (from Day 8 to 14). Furthermore, the house consists of two floors, the upper luxury floor and the lower poverty floor. Housemates on the luxury floor will choose of the poor housemates to join them upstairs, whilst the public will vote one of the 7 downstairs.

House
This year's Promi Big Brother contains two floors, each floor having their separate living areas, bathrooms, bedrooms and diary rooms. The upper floor will be luxurious, whilst the lower floor is meager with no beds or real seating. This years the downstairs area was changed into a sewerage.

Housemates

Distribution of housemates
As in the last two seasons, the participants were distributed before the broadcast of the show by the producers in the respective areas. From the first show, the participants and the audience could change the distribution of the housemates in each case by voting and using the Duel Arena.

Duel Arena

As in the previous duels between the Duels also took place this year. Big Brother (voiced by Phil Daub) each appoint one or two residents from the "house" who must compete at the Duel Arena. In the Duel Arena they both played a game and the loser must face the consequences for his living area. A draw always win the inhabitants in the "upstairs". The duels each can either have a positive impact on the winners section or consequences for the loser section. So must for example, the losing team changing areas, receives less food or have to give personal items.

 All housemates lived after the merge at downstairs. Therefore, there were two housemates competing from the same area.

Nominations table
 – Downstairs Housemates after week 1
 – Upstairs Housemates after week 1
 – Immune from nomination 
 – Nominated before the actual nomination
 – This round of nominations were to save.

Notes

: On Day 6 Edona was ejected because she broke several rules.
: Stephen was immune from the first nomination after winning the duel on Day 9, while Mario was immediately nominated after he lost the duel.
: The housemates were only allowed to nominate a housemate in their area.
: On Day 11 all housemates faced the public vote.
: Marcus was immune from the third nomination after winning the duel on Day 12 but he gave it to Natascha, while Mario was immediately nominated after he lost the duel.
: The housemates had to nominate face to face.
: The housemates had to choose a housemate to be protected, so to be immune from the public vote rather than nominate. The housemates with the fewest votes to be immune would be nominated. No one got evicted on Day 14 the public could vote for 24 hours and the eviction took place on Day 15.
: After the eviction from Day 14 the housemates took place in a duel. The winners, Cathy and Mario, could nominate twice and it didn't matter if both votes went to the same person, while the losers, Jessica and Joachim, were not allowed not nominate.
: Ben was immune from the last nomination after winning the duel on Day 16, while Frank was immediately nominated after losing the duel. Also the housemates had to nominate face to face.

Ratings

External links

2016 German television seasons
05